Bill Tom Closs (January 8, 1922 – June 6, 2011) was an American basketball player. He played collegiately for Rice University.  In his final year, he led the Southwest Conference in scoring and was All-American in 1943. In 1971 he was inducted into the Rice Athletic Hall of Fame, and in 2003 his basketball jersey was retired.

He joined the Marine Reserve while still at Rice, and was posted in the Fleet Marine Force Pacific Headquarters in Oahu, Hawaii in 1944.

Closs started professional basketball with Indianapolis in 1946.  He played for the Anderson Packers (1948–50), Philadelphia Warriors (1950–51) and Fort Wayne Pistons (1951–52) in the National Basketball Association (NBA) for 186 games.  Following the conclusion of his professional basketball career, Closs enjoyed over 35 years of success in the sporting goods industry.

Closs died on June 6, 2011.

References

External links

NBL stats

1922 births
2011 deaths
All-American college men's basketball players
American men's basketball players
United States Marine Corps personnel of World War II
Anderson Packers players
Basketball players from Texas
Fort Wayne Pistons players
Indianapolis Kautskys players
People from Brazos County, Texas
Philadelphia Warriors players
Professional Basketball League of America players
Rice Owls men's basketball players
Small forwards
Military personnel from Texas
United States Marine Corps reservists